Nontembeko Nothemba "Ntobeko" Boyce is a South African politician who has been serving as the Speaker of the KwaZulu-Natal Legislature since 22 May 2019. A member of the African National Congress (ANC), she joined the legislature in May 2014. She served as the deputy chief whip before her appointment as chief whip in 2016. She also formerly served as the chairperson of the legislature's Standing Committee on Oversight.

References

External links
Ms Nontembeko Nothemba Boyce – People's Assembly
Hon. NN Boyce – KZN Legislature

Living people
Year of birth missing (living people)
Xhosa people
Members of the KwaZulu-Natal Legislature
African National Congress politicians
People from KwaZulu-Natal
People from the Eastern Cape
Politicians from KwaZulu-Natal
Women legislative speakers
Women members of provincial legislatures of South Africa
21st-century South African politicians
21st-century South African women politicians